Thomas Fremantle may refer to:

Thomas Fremantle (Royal Navy officer) (1765–1819), British admiral and friend of Lord Nelson
Thomas Fremantle, 1st Baron Cottesloe (1798–1890), Conservative politician
Thomas Fremantle, 2nd Baron Cottesloe (1830–1918), British businessman and politician
Thomas Fremantle, 3rd Baron Cottesloe (1862–1956), expert rifleman and Olympian